Ebenezer is an unincorporated community located in Holmes County, Mississippi.

According to a 1905 source, Ebenezer was named by settlers from "the old Jewish city". It may have been a destination of some German-Jewish immigrants, who settled mostly in Lexington in the county beginning in the 1830s. They were joined later in the century by Russian Jewish immigrants. The community built Temple Beth El in Lexington in 1905; it closed in 2009 because of declining population.

Perry Wilbon Howard was born in Ebenezer in 1877 to African-American parents who had been enslaved. He became an attorney among the second generation of African-American lawyers in the state, with a practice in the state capital of Jackson. Even after the state legislature disfranchised most blacks through provisions of the 1890 constitution, Howard continued to be active as a member of the Republican Party. He served as a national committeeman from the state, and a civil rights activist. Appointed as an aide in the office of the United States Attorney General in the administration of President Warren G. Harding, Howard was the highest-ranking African American in government at the time.

Robert G. Clark Jr. was born October 3, 1928, in Ebenezer and presently resides there. In 1967 he was the first African American elected to the Mississippi State Legislature since the Reconstruction era. Until 1976 he was the only African-American representative in the state house, having been repeatedly returned to office. In 1992 he was elected Speaker Pro Tempore of the Mississippi House of Representatives and he continued to serve in that position until retired in 2003.

References

Unincorporated communities in Holmes County, Mississippi
Unincorporated communities in Mississippi